Skaar may refer to:

Skaar (comics), a fictional character from Marvel Comics
Skaar Ridge, a ridge on the southeast side of Mount Augusta in Queen Alexandra Range
Bryn Christopher or Skaar, British singer

People with the surname
Andrew O. Skaar (1922–2018), American farmer and politician

See also
Skaare
Skåre
Scarr